Yu Hao (970) was a Chinese architect, structural engineer, and writer during the Song Dynasty.

Legacy
Yu Hao was given the title of Master-Carpenter (Du Liao Jiang) for his architectural skill. He wrote the Mu Jing (木經; Timberwork Manual) when he was active sometime between 965 and 995, considered an important piece of classical Chinese architectural literature, and although it no longer survives, Shen Kuo quoted from it. In 989, his architectural design and structural engineering work culminated in the construction of the Kai-Bao Pagoda, a wooden Chinese pagoda of medieval Kaifeng (the Northern Song's capital city). The pagoda was lost in a 1040 lightning conflagration, while the now-famous Iron Pagoda of Kaifeng was rebuilt on the same spot in 1049, constructed out of brick and stone to resist arson and lightning fires.

Timberwork Manual
Writing a century later (c. 1088), the polymath scientist and statesman Shen Kuo (1031–1095) praised the architectural writings of Yu Hao. Below are two passages from Shen's book Meng Xi Bi Tan (Dream Pool Essays), outlining the basics contained in Yu's 10th-century work on early Song-era architecture.

In the first quote, Shen describes a scene in which Yu gives advice to another artisan architect about slanting struts for diagonal wind bracing (Wade-Giles spelling):

In this next quote, Shen describes the dimensions and types of architecture outlined in Yu Hao's book (Wade-Giles spelling):

See also
Architecture of Song Dynasty
Chinese architecture
List of architects

Notes

References
Needham, Joseph (1986). Science and Civilization in China: Volume 4, Part 3. Taipei: Caves Books, Ltd.

External links
 A Heping Liu article with info on Yu Hao

Architectural theoreticians
Artists from Hangzhou
10th-century Chinese architects
Chinese architectural history
Chinese structural engineers
Engineers from Zhejiang
Song dynasty architecture
Song dynasty science writers
Writers from Hangzhou
Year of birth unknown
Year of death unknown
Place of death unknown